The painted apple moth (Teia anartoides) is a tussock moth native to Australia. It is notable as a pest in pine forests, and is classified as a pest in New Zealand.

In New Zealand, controversy  over an aerial spraying programme arose when an outbreak of the moth was identified in Auckland.

See also
Painted apple moth in New Zealand

References

Lymantriinae
Moths described in 1855
Moths of Australia
Moths of New Zealand
Taxa named by Francis Walker (entomologist)